ALPG may refer to:

 Australian Ladies Professional Golf, see ALPG Tour
 Abundant Life Prayer Group
 Prayer Tower
 Oral Roberts Evangelistic Association (OREA)